Lieutenant General Hugh Percy, 2nd Duke of Northumberland  (14 August 174210 July 1817) was an officer in the British army and later a British peer. He participated in the Battles of Lexington and Concord and the Battle of Long Island during the American War of Independence, but resigned his command in 1777 due to disagreements with his superior, General William Howe.

Born Hugh Smithson, he assumed the surname of Percy by Act of Parliament along with his father in 1750 and was styled Lord Warkworth from 1750 until 1766. He was styled Earl Percy from 1766, when his father was created Duke of Northumberland. He acceded to the dukedom in 1786.

Family

He was the son of Sir Hugh Smithson and Lady Elizabeth Seymour, heiress of the House of Percy.  In 1750, upon the death of his maternal grandfather Algernon Seymour, 7th Duke of Somerset, his father became Earl of Northumberland and changed his name to Percy.

Early career
In 1759, he joined the British Army as a teenager and was a captain of the 85th Regiment of Foot by age 17, an achievement that demonstrated the power of wealth and family standing. He was, nonetheless, a good soldier and fought with distinction in 1759 at the battles of Bergen and Minden. In 1760, he went up to St John's College, Cambridge. Afterwards, he married Lady Anne Crichton-Stuart, daughter of Lord Bute, on 2 July 1764. 

In 1766, his father was granted a dukedom and he was styled Earl Percy. As a Member of Parliament and the son-in-law of Lord Bute, Percy was promoted to full colonel and appointed an aide-de-camp to the King in 1764, having barely reached his majority. Percy was in chronically poor health from gout and had poor eyesight. He was physically unattractive, being overly thin and having a large nose. Yet, "He was honorable and brave, candid and decent, impeccably mannered, and immensely generous with his wealth."

American War of Independence

In Parliament, where he was member for Westminster from 1763 to 1776, he had opposed the policy that led to the American War of Independence. However, he was sent to Boston in 1774 with the local rank of brigadier general, colonel of the 5th Regiment of Foot (later called the Northumberland Fusiliers). His views on the military discipline were ahead of their time. "He detested corporal punishments. At a time when other commanders were resorting to floggings and firing squads on Boston Common, he led his regiment by precept and example." Politically a Whig, he at first sympathized with the colonials, but he soon began to despise their behavior. He led the relief column at the Battle of Lexington and Concord. Percy's intelligent actions probably saved the British forces from complete disaster that day.

When his brigade relieved Francis Smith's demoralized troops at Lexington, Percy carefully organized his forces so as to provide all-around protection. He also used his two 6-pounder field guns to break up large formations of American militia. Even so, William Heath, who led the colonials, managed to surround the retreating British column with fire during a grueling forced march.  When the British found that the bridge over the Charles River in Cambridge was blocked, Percy turned his column down a side road and led them west to Charlestown. "This sudden change of direction, and the brilliant use of an obscure and unexpected road, took the New England men by surprise. It broke the circle of fire around Percy's brigade." When a final colonial force tried to block British progress at Prospect Hill, "Percy advanced his cannon to the front of his column, and cleared the hill with a few well-placed rounds. It was the last of his ammunition for the artillery. Percy's attitude towards New Englanders turned from contempt to grudging respect. He wrote:
During the whole affair, the rebels attacked us in a very scattered, irregular manner, but with perseverance and resolution, nor did they ever dare to form into a regular body. Indeed they knew too well what was proper, to do so. Whoever looks upon them as an irregular mob, will find himself very much mistaken. They have men amongst them who know very well what they are about, having been employed as rangers against the Indians and Canadians, and this country being very much covered with wood, and hilly, is very advantageous for their method of fighting.

He was absent from the field during the Battle of Bunker Hill, perhaps due to a quarrel with General Howe, a man with whom Percy could not get along.  The following year, Percy commanded a division during the Battle of Long Island and led the storming of Fort Washington.  By 1777, he had achieved the rank of lieutenant general, but grew so disgusted with the conduct of the war by General Howe that he resigned his command and left America in 1777 in part after a dispute over a quantity of hay. More substantively, while in command of a detached British force garrisoning Rhode Island he fell into disagreement with General Howe over the feasibility of advancing into the hostile New England hinterland.

Second marriage

Percy was granted a divorce in Parliament from Lady Anne in 1779 on the grounds of her adultery and immediately married Frances Julia Burrell on 23 May 1779, with whom he had six daughters and three sons, with three daughters and two sons surviving him.

In 1786, he acceded to the title upon his father's death and continued his father's agricultural improvements. For example, when corn prices fell after 1815, he reduced his rents by twenty-five percent. He held twice-weekly gatherings at Alnwick Castle, inviting tenants and local tradespeople. He exercised considerable influence in politics, though he never obtained office. He was created a Knight of the Garter in 1788. He became a general in 1793, and assumed command of the Percy Yeomanry Regiment in 1798 and as colonel of the Royal Horse Guards in 1806.

Notorious for a bad temper as well as for being one of the richest men in England, the second Duke of Northumberland died suddenly of "rheumatic gout" in July 1817. He was buried in the Northumberland Vault, within Westminster Abbey, and was succeeded by his son Hugh Percy, 3rd Duke of Northumberland. Percy's illegitimate half brother was James Smithson, whose bequest founded the Smithsonian Institution.

See also
Bill Richmond, a man born into slavery in Colonial America whom Percy freed and brought to England in 1777 and who went on to become a celebrated boxer

Footnotes

References
Bowler, R. Arthur. Logistics and the Failure of the British Army in America, 1775–1783. Princeton, NJ: Princeton University Press, 1975. .
Fischer, David Hackett. Paul Revere's Ride. New York: Oxford University Press, 1994. .
Purcell, L. Edward. Who was Who in the American Revolution. New York: Facts on File, 1993. .

External links
Percy Family Papers. James Marshall and Marie-Louise Osborn Collection, Beinecke Rare Book and Manuscript Library, Yale University.
Life and military career

|-

1742 births
1817 deaths
Alumni of St John's College, Cambridge
British Army generals
British Army personnel of the American Revolutionary War
British Life Guards officers
British MPs 1761–1768
British MPs 1768–1774
British MPs 1774–1780
302
Fellows of the Royal Society
Hugh Percy, 02nd Duke of Northumberland
Knights of the Garter
Lord-Lieutenants of Northumberland
Percy, Hugh Percy, Earl
Royal Horse Guards officers
Royal Northumberland Fusiliers officers
Burials at Westminster Abbey